Uyira Maanama is a 1968 Indian Tamil-language film written and directed by K. S. Gopalakrishnan. The film stars Jaishankar, Vijaya Nirmala, R. Muthuraman and Krishna Kumari. It was released on 21 October 1968 (Diwali day), and was commercially successful.

Plot

Cast 
 Jaishankar as Kannan
 Vijaya Nirmala
 R. Muthuraman
M. N. Nambiar
Nagesh
 S. Varalakshmi as Kannan's sister-in-law
 T. K. Bhagavathi as Santhanam
 Saroja Devi
 Krishna Kumari as a Russian woman
Radhabhai

Production 
Uyira Maanama was written and directed by K. S. Gopalakrishnan, and produced by K. S. Sabarinathan under Amarjothi Movies. One of the shooting locations was Yercaud.

Soundtrack 
The soundtrack was composed by M. S. Viswanathan and the lyrics were written by Kannadasan.

Release and reception 
Uyira Manama was released on 21 October 1968 (Diwali day), and was commercially successful.

References

Bibliography

External links 
 

1960s Tamil-language films
1968 drama films
1968 films
Films directed by K. S. Gopalakrishnan
Films scored by M. S. Viswanathan
Films with screenplays by K. S. Gopalakrishnan
Indian drama films